Elizabeth Marian Swaney OLY (born 30 July 1984) is an American born-and-raised freestyle skier who competed for Hungary in the 2018 Winter Olympics in the women's halfpipe based on her Hungarian ancestry. She was unable to qualify for the 2014 Winter Olympics for Venezuela in both skeleton and freestyle skiing, and qualified for the 2018 Winter Olympics in the women's halfpipe, in which she placed last.

Athletic career
While at University of California, Berkeley, Swaney was the coxswain for the men's rowing team. She first thought she would try competing in bobsleigh as a pilot, but was told she was too small to be competitive in the sport. She then turned to skeleton and freestyle skiing, in which she sought to represent Venezuela, her mother's homeland, at the 2014 Winter Olympics. She started skiing for Hungary in 2015, based on her grandparents' country of birth.

Olympic qualifying
Swaney qualified for the 2018 Winter Olympics representing Hungary in half-pipe skiing. Beginning in 2013 she attended all the World Cup qualifying events over the two Olympic qualifying years, and the 2017 World Championship in Sierra Nevada, Spain. In order to qualify for the Olympics, athletes needed to place in the top 30 at either a FIS Freestyle Ski World Cup event or FIS Freestyle World Ski Championships, and score a minimum of 50.00 FIS points. Swaney achieved this by attending competitions with fewer than thirty participants, with one event in China having fifteen (in which she placed thirteenth). Thirteen of her top 30 finishes were a result of her showing up, not falling, and recording a score. As a result of Swaney's selection of competitions, she was ranked 34th in her run up to the Olympics. The Olympic quota system also aided in her qualifying. While 24 women were able to compete in half-pipe competition, there are limits on the number of skiers each country could send. The maximum a country could send was twenty-six (with maximums of fourteen men and fourteen women) across all freestyle skiing events. So while the United States had six women ranked within the top 20 in the world in halfpipe skiing, only four were allowed to compete in the Olympics based on the quota system. Between the quota system and injuries, Swaney's ranking of 34 granted her qualification for the Olympics.

2018 Olympics
At the 2018 Winter Olympics, Swaney competed in the women's half-pipe, in what was described as a "perfectly mediocre run", without falling. She scored 30.00 and 31.40, "barely attempting a trick" in either of her two runs. She placed last in the competition, 13.60 points behind Laila Friis-Salling of Denmark, who had fallen in both of her qualifying runs.  The incident prompted the Hungarian Olympic Committee (MOB) to reevaluate its selection process, and possible changes to the quota system. As of 2021, no changes have been made to the FIS freestyle ski selection process in halfpipe skiing.

While critics called her Olympic performance a "mockery", she received support from Canadian gold medalist skier Cassie Sharpe, who said, "If you are going to put in the time and effort to be here, then you deserve to be here as much as I do." Gold medalist Maddie Bowman, and David Wise, a double gold medalist, also defended her. Jeff Passan from Yahoo Sports was one of the few to interview Swaney at the games and wrote a piece, "Is Elizabeth Swaney the worst Olympian? Actually, she might be the best."

Personal life
Swaney grew up in a bilingual Spanish-English household in the Oakland Rockridge neighborhood. Her father, Tom Swaney, owns an insurance agency and her mother, Ines Swaney, is a Spanish interpreter. She also has a brother. In her youth, Swaney was the only girl in her local soccer and Little League teams and in high school, rowed for the Oakland Strokes. She graduated from the University of California, Berkeley with a triple major with honors in Political Economy, German, and Political Science in 2007. While in college, she briefly launched a campaign for Governor of California. At Berkeley, she was a coxswain and the only woman on the championship Division I Men’s Crew/Rowing team and a Pac-10 Second Team All-American. After graduation she studied for and received a Master's in Design Studies with a focus on Real Estate at Harvard University. While at Harvard, she volunteered as the assistant coach for their Track and Field team. Besides being an active marathoner and skier, she has also competed internationally in skeleton sliding.

Professionally, Swaney has worked as a technical recruiter for Thumbtack. She has competed in American Ninja Warrior and is the Finance Director for Spinsters of San Francisco.

See also
Eddie the Eagle

References

External links

Swaney's FIS Page

1984 births
Living people
Freestyle skiers at the 2018 Winter Olympics
Hungarian female freestyle skiers
American female freestyle skiers
Olympic freestyle skiers of Hungary
Harvard University alumni
University of California, Berkeley alumni
American people of Hungarian descent
American sportspeople of Venezuelan descent
Harvard Crimson track and field coaches
Sportspeople from Oakland, California
California Golden Bears rowers
21st-century American women